Corannulene is a polycyclic aromatic hydrocarbon with chemical formula C20H10. The molecule consists of a cyclopentane ring fused with 5 benzene rings, so another name for it is [5]circulene.  It is of scientific interest because it is a geodesic polyarene and can be considered a fragment of buckminsterfullerene.  Due to this connection and also its bowl shape, corannulene is also known as a buckybowl.  Buckybowls are fragments of buckyballs.  Corannulene exhibits a bowl-to-bowl inversion with an inversion barrier of 10.2 kcal/mol (42.7 kJ/mol) at −64 °C.

Synthesis
Several synthetic routes exist to corannulene. Flash vacuum pyrolysis techniques generally have lower chemical yields than solution-chemistry syntheses, but offer routes to more derivatives. Corannulane was first isolated in 1966 by multistep organic synthesis. In 1971, the synthesis and properties of corannulane were reported. A flash vacuum pyrolysis method followed in 1991.  One synthesis based on solution chemistry consists of a nucleophilic displacement–elimination reaction of an octabromide with sodium hydroxide:

The bromine substituents are removed with an excess of n-butyllithium.

A kilogram scale synthesis of corannulene has been achieved.

Much effort is directed at functionalization of the corannulene ring with novel functional groups such as ethynyl groups, ether groups, thioether groups, platinum functional groups, aryl groups, phenalenyl fused  and indeno extensions. and ferrocene groups.

Aromaticity
The observed aromaticity for this compound is explained with a so-called annulene-within-an-annulene model. According to this model corannulene is made up of an aromatic 6 electron cyclopentadienyl anion  surrounded by an aromatic 14 electron annulenyl cation. This model was suggested by Barth and Lawton in the first synthesis of corannulene in 1966. They also suggested the trivial name 'corannulene', which is derived from the annulene-within-an-annulene model: core + annulene.

However, later theoretical calculations have disputed the validity of this approximation.

Reactions

Reduction 
Corannulene can be reduced up to a tetraanion in a series of one-electron reductions. This has been performed with alkali metals, electrochemically and with bases. The corannulene dianion is antiaromatic and tetraanion is again aromatic. With lithium as reducing agent two tetraanions form a supramolecular dimer with two bowls stacked into each other with 4 lithium ions in between and 2 pairs above and below the stack. This self-assembly motif was applied in the organization of fullerenes. Penta-substituted fullerenes (with methyl or phenyl groups) charged with five electrons form supramolecular dimers with a complementary corannulene tetraanion bowl, 'stitched' by interstitial lithium cations. In a related system 5 lithium ions are sandwiched between two corannulene bowls 

In one cyclopenta[bc]corannulene a concave - concave aggregate is observed by NMR spectroscopy with 2 C–Li–C bonds connecting the tetraanions.

Metals tend to bind to the convex face of the annulene. Concave binding has been reported for a cesium / crown ether system

Oxidation
UV 193-nm photoionization effectively removes a π-electron from the twofold degenerate E1-HOMO located in the aromatic network of electrons yielding a corannulene radical cation. Owing to the degeneracy in the HOMO orbital, the corannulene radical cation is unstable in its original C5v molecular arrangement, and therefore, subject to Jahn-Teller (JT) vibronic distortion.

Using electrospray ionization, a protonated corannulene cation has been produced in which the protonation site was observed to be on a peripheral sp2-carbon atom.

Reaction with electrophiles
Corannulene can react with electrophiles to form a corannulene carbocation. Reaction with chloromethane and aluminium chloride results in the formation of an AlCl4− salt with a methyl group situated at the center with the cationic center at the rim. X-ray diffraction analysis shows that the new carbon-carbon bond is elongated (157 pm)

Bicorannulenyl
Bicorannulenyl is the product of dehydrogenative coupling of corannulene.  With the formula C20H9-C20H9, it consists of two corannulene units connected through a single C-C bond. The molecule's stereochemistry consists of two chiral elements: the asymmetry of a singly substituted corannulenyl, and the helical twist about the central bond. In the neutral state, bicorannulenyl exists as 12 conformers, which interconvert through multiple bowl-inversions and bond-rotations. 
When bicorannulenyl is reduced to a dianion with potassium metal, the central bond assumes significant double-bond character. This change is attributed to the orbital structure, which has a LUMO orbital localized on the central bond. When bicorannulenyl is reduced to an octaanion with lithium metal, it self-assembles into supramolecular oligomers. This motif illustrates "charged polyarene stacking".

Research
The corannulene group is used in host–guest chemistry with interactions based on pi stacking, notably with fullerenes (the buckycatcher)  but also with nitrobenzene

Alkyl-substituted corannulenes form a thermotropic hexagonal columnar liquid crystalline mesophase. Corannulene has also been used as the core group in a dendrimer.  Like other PAHs, corannulene ligates metals. Corannulenes with ethynyl groups are investigated for their potential use as blue emitters. The structure was analyzed by infrared spectroscopy, Raman spectroscopy, and X-ray photoelectron spectroscopy.

See also

 Coronene
 Helicene
 Geodesic polyarene

References 

Geodesic polyarenes
Polycyclic aromatic hydrocarbons